Maxime Josse (born 21 March 1987 in Saint-Quentin) is a French football player who plays for FC La Chaux-de-Fonds.

Josse was part of the France national youth football team that won the 2004 UEFA European Under-17 Football Championship.

Career

In France
Josse began his career at Sochaux breaking through the Youth Academy and made his Ligue 1 debut in a 2–2 away draw against Paris Saint-Germain on 14 May 2005. In his first two seasons he earned only 9 appearances and for the 2006–07 season he was loaned out to Stade Brestois in the Ligue 2.

Josse's debut for Stade Brestois came on 8 September 2006 in a 0–0 home draw against Montpellier HSC. By the end of his loan at Brestois, he had made 20 league appearances.

After spending the 2007–08 season at Sochaux, on 28 August 2009, Josse signed for Angers SCO on a season-long loan.

Litex Lovech
On 6 July 2011, Josse joined Bulgarian side Litex Lovech on a three-year contract, taking squad number 6, after it was vacated by Ivaylo Petkov.

Career statistics
As of 1 July 2011

References

External links

1987 births
Living people
French footballers
French expatriate footballers
Ligue 1 players
Ligue 2 players
Israeli Premier League players
First Professional Football League (Bulgaria) players
Super League Greece players
FC Sochaux-Montbéliard players
Stade Brestois 29 players
Angers SCO players
PFC Litex Lovech players
Bnei Sakhnin F.C. players
Panthrakikos F.C. players
Expatriate footballers in Bulgaria
Expatriate footballers in Israel
Expatriate footballers in Greece
France youth international footballers
France under-21 international footballers
Association football defenders
People from Saint-Quentin, Aisne
Sportspeople from Aisne
Footballers from Hauts-de-France
Expatriate footballers in Finland
Expatriate footballers in Switzerland
French expatriate sportspeople in Finland
French expatriate sportspeople in Switzerland
French expatriate sportspeople in Bulgaria
French expatriate sportspeople in Greece
French expatriate sportspeople in Israel